Doris Allen may refer to:
Doris Twitchell Allen (1901–2002), American psychologist and founder of Children's International Summer Villages
Doris Allen (politician) (1936–1999), California politician
Doris Allen (singer), 1950s and 1960s American singer